Maharao Pragmalji II,  (1839−1875) (reign: 1860-1875) was the Rao of Cutch, a ruler of Jadeja dynasty who ascended the throne upon death of his father & king Rao Deshalji II on 26 July 1860 and ruled till his death on  19 December 1875.

He was a progressive King and the forts of Mandvi, Mundra were re-built during his time. The embankment of Hamirsar Lake, Prag Mahal in Bhuj were other constructions during his reign. It was during his reign the system of state-funded education started. 

In 1870 he started Alfred High School, the first high school of Kutch at Bhuj. He was succeeded by his son Khengarji III of Kutch. Prag Mahal, named after him, which was commissioned by him in 1865, designed by Colon Wilkins, was built for by the British architects and the Kutchi builders was completed after his death in the year 1879 during reign of his son, Khengarji III. The Port Police, Special cell for minerals, Forest officers for forest protection and the first Bhuj Municipality was formed during the reign of Pragmulji. The civil and army laws were framed under guidance of British. Also the modernization set foot in Kutch with the appointment of Non Kutchi Dewan Dewan Bahadur Krishnaji Tulkar, Police Commissioner Pandurang Shivram, and as the Chief Justice Shri Vinayakrao Bhagwat in which only Kutchis were appointed till then.

Political Office

References

1839 births
1875 deaths
Maharajas of Kutch
Hindu monarchs
Founders of Indian schools and colleges
Indian royalty
Knights Grand Commander of the Order of the Star of India
Indian knights